Bellmont may refer to:

 Bellmont, Illinois, United States
 Bellmont, New York, United States
 Bellmont High School, Decatur, Indiana

See also
 Belmont (disambiguation)
Bellemont (disambiguation)